DICOMweb is a term applied to the family of RESTful DICOM services defined for sending, retrieving and querying for medical images and related information.

The intent is to provide a light-weight mobile device and web browser friendly mechanism for accessing images, which can be implemented by developers who have minimal familiarity with the DICOM standard and which uses consumer application friendly mechanisms like http, JSON and  media types (like "image/jpeg") to the maximum extent possible.

The standard is formally defined in DICOM PS3.18 Web Services.

The DICOMweb services are distinguished from other DICOM web services by the suffix "-RS", indicating their RESTful nature.

The family consists primarily of:
 WADO-RS for retrieval of DICOM PS3.10 files, meta data in XML or JSON forms, bulk data separated from the meta data and rendered consumer format images
 STOW-RS for storage (sending) of DICOM PS3.10 files or separated meta data and bulk data
 QIDO-RS for querying collections (databases, registries) of DICOM objects

A key feature of the WADO-RS services is the ability to retrieve entire studies and series rather than needing repeated request for individual instances.

Other services including support for work lists (UPS-RS) and retrieval of server capabilities.

Examples 

Some very simple examples of URL syntax and meta data encoding are described in the DICOMweb Cheatsheet.

Comparison with Conventional DICOM services 

Roughly speaking, the DICOMweb services can be compared with the conventional DIMSE DICOM services as follows:

Indeed, apart from the different encoding of the request, packaging of the response and protocol used, the services are sufficiently similar that a DICOMweb proxy to a conventional implementation of DICOM DIMSE services can be implemented (this is by design). The conventional DIMSE DICOM services do actually have capabilities that correspond to the instance and frame level (Instance and Frame Level Retrieve) and separate meta data retrieval capabilities (Composite Instance Retrieve Without Bulk Data) of DICOMweb, though these are not nearly as widely implemented as the traditional study-root study, series and image retrieval services.

History 

Earlier DICOM web services used either URL parameters (WADO-URI) or SOAP-based web services (WADO-WS) to retrieve DICOM objects.

The original Web Access to DICOM Persistent Objects (WADO) standard was a joint effort by DICOM and an ISO working group  and was released in 2003 as DICOM Supplement 85 and ISO 17432. The word "persistent" in the name was later dropped. The ISO standard has not been maintained as DICOM PS3.18 has evolved over time. The suffix "-URI" was later added to distinguish what is now called WADO-URI from the newer services. WADO-URI became popular for providing access to both original DICOM files and server side rendered versions of them, and accordingly was included in the IHE XDS-I.b profile as one of its required transport mechanisms, 

After IHE had gone through several revisions of the XDS-I profile, it defined a SOAP-based mechanism for transferring images (the RAD-69 transaction), and this was added to DICOM retrospectively, extended, and became WADO-WS, which was subsequently retired since it was incomplete and not being maintained.

As part of DICOM Supplement 118 - Application Hosting, finalized in 2010, an XML "native DICOM model" was introduced that defined bi-directional transcoding of DICOM datasets between the conventional binary representation and an XML representation.

An independent group of developers defined an alternative transport mechanism, Medical Imaging Network Transport (MINT), and proposed it as an extension to DICOM. Though MINT was not adopted in its entirety, the developers were assimilated by DICOM WG 27, and several key features of MINT were defined as extensions to DICOM PS3.18. Historical information about MINT can be found at the original MINT Google Code site.

The current set of DICOM web services in DICOM PS3.18, which include DICOMweb, have evolved (or are being extended) through the following supplements:

 DICOM Supplement 85 - Web Access to DICOM Objects (WADO)
 DICOM Supplement 148 - Web Access to DICOM Persistent Objects by Means of Web Services Extension of the Retrieve Service (WADO Web Service)
 DICOM Supplement 161 - WADO by means of RESTful Services
 DICOM Supplement 163 - Store Over the Web by RESTful Services (STOW-RS)
 DICOM Supplement 166 - Query based on ID for DICOM Objects by RESTful Services (QIDO-RS)
 DICOM Supplement 170 - Server Options RESTful Services
 DICOM Supplement 171 - Unified Procedure Step by REpresentational State Transfer (REST) Services
 DICOM Supplement 174 - RESTful Rendering
 DICOM Supplement 183 - PS3.18 Web Services Re-Documentation
 DICOM Supplement 193 - REST Notifications
 DICOM Supplement 194 - RESTful Services for Non-Patient Instances
 DICOM Supplement 198 - Retirement of WADO-WS
 DICOM Supplement 203 - Thumbnail Resources for DICOMweb
 DICOM Supplement 211 - DICOMweb Support for Retrieve via application/zip
 DICOM Supplement 228 - DICOMweb API for Server-Side Volumetric Rendering	

Take care to always use the current DICOM standard though, rather than implementing from any supplement, since corrections and additions have been incorporated over time.

Implementations

Server 

 DCM4CHEE Archive
 Orthanc Features supported
 Medical Connections
 OsiriX 8.5 or higher

Client 

 OHIF Viewer
 OsiriX Viewer 8.5 or higher
 Orthanc

Further reading 
 Genereaux BW, Dennison DK, Ho K, Horn R, Silver EL, O’Donnell K, et al. DICOMweb: Background and Application of the Web Standard for Medical Imaging. J Digit Imaging. 2018 May 10;1–6. doi:10.1007/s10278-018-0073-z

External links 
 What is DICOMweb?
 DICOMweb Cheatsheet
 DICOMweb Resources
 REST-based APIs: Overview and Progress Since SIIM14
 Image Access Everywhere
 Making DICOMWeb Fast
 Information about DICOMweb - API's, implementations, etc.
 Presentations from DICOMweb Conference and Hands-on Workshop 2015
 DICOMweb Implementer's Google Group

References

Medical imaging
DICOM software
Health informatics